Acroá (Acroá-mirim) is an extinct Akuwẽ (Central Jê) language (Jê, Macro-Jê) of Brazil. It was spoken by the Acroá people around the headwaters of the Parnaíba and of the Paranaíba in Bahia, who were later settled in the missions of São José do Duro (Formiga) and in São José de Mossâmedes. The language went extinct before it could be documented; it is only known through a short wordlist collected by Carl Friedrich Philipp von Martius.

References

External links 
OLAC resources in and about the Acroá language

Jê languages
Extinct languages of South America
Languages of Brazil